Discodon is a genus of soldier beetles in the family Cantharidae. There are more than 40 described species in Discodon.

Species
These 44 species belong to the genus Discodon:

 Discodon abdominale Schaeffer, 1909
 Discodon abdominalis Schaeffer
 Discodon amazonum Pic, 1950
 Discodon arcuatum Constantin, 2015
 Discodon arnetti Wittmer
 Discodon bicoloricolle Pic, 1927
 Discodon bipunctatum Schaeffer, 1908
 Discodon brulei Constantin, 2015
 Discodon chapini Wittmer
 Discodon dalensi Constantin, 2015
 Discodon dewynteri Constantin, 2015
 Discodon dichromum (Fauvel, 1861)
 Discodon fernandezorum Constantin, 2015
 Discodon flavimarginatus Schaeffer
 Discodon flavomarginatum Schaeffer, 1908
 Discodon francillonnei Constantin, 2015
 Discodon fuscomaculatum Constantin, 2015
 Discodon gracilicorne Pic, 1910
 Discodon hirticorne Constantin, 2015
 Discodon huadquinaense Wittmer
 Discodon humeropictum Wittmer
 Discodon itoupense Constantin, 2015
 Discodon lamarrei Constantin, 2015
 Discodon lemoulti Pic, 1910
 Discodon luteicorne Constantin, 2015
 Discodon mantillerii Constantin, 2015
 Discodon maroninum Pic, 1930
 Discodon melanocerum Constantin, 2015
 Discodon montis Constantin, 2015
 Discodon nazareti Constantin, 2015
 Discodon nigripes Gorham, 1881
 Discodon nouraguense Constantin, 2015
 Discodon pascali Constantin, 2015
 Discodon peruvianum Wittmer
 Discodon planicolle (LeConte, 1858)
 Discodon platycorne Constantin, 2015
 Discodon poirieri Constantin, 2015
 Discodon quadrinotatum Constantin, 2015
 Discodon rufohumerale Pic, 1910
 Discodon saulense Constantin, 2015
 Discodon surinamense Pic, 1906
 Discodon taghavianae Constantin, 2015
 Discodon touroulti Constantin, 2015
 Discodon yvineci Constantin, 2015

References

Further reading

 
 

Cantharidae
Articles created by Qbugbot